Bailando Kids is an Argentine dancing competition show on the show Bailando por un Sueño (which is, at the same time, the Argentine version of Dancing with the Stars) involving couples composed of children from 7 to 12 years old who are judged by a jury. It was broadcast by El Trece and the host was Marcelo Tinelli during the first three weeks and then José María Listorti during the next four. It premiered on May 7, 2009 and the season finale was on June 19, 2009. The show was strongly criticized by various sectors for manipulation of the child competitors.

The jury were the dancer Laura Fidalgo, theatral directors Reina Reech and Carmen Barbieri and comedian Miguel Angel Cherutti. The winner was Pedro Maurizi partnered with Candela Rodríguez.

The show wasn't renewed for a new season due to low ratings. El Trece continued producing the standard competition for adults instead in further years.

Couples

Scoring chart

Red numbers indicate the lowest score for each week.
Green numbers indicate the highest score for each week.
 indicates the couple eliminated that week.
 indicates the returning couple was saved by the judges.
 indicates the returning couple was the last to be called safe and finished in the bottom two.
 indicates the couple that withdrew.
 indicates the winning couple.
 indicates the runner-up couple.
 indicates the semifinalists couples.

Highest and lowest scoring performances 
The best and worst performances in each dance according to the judges' marks are as follows:

Ratings

 The average audience of the contest was 18.4 rating points, 46.1% share of the screen (share) and 1,781,000 viewers.

References

External links
  Canal 13's Showmatch website

Dance competition television shows